Rincón is a popular beach town and municipality of Puerto Rico founded in 1771 by Don Luis de Añasco, who previously founded Añasco in 1733. It is located in the Western Coastal Valley, west of Añasco and Aguada. Rincón is spread over 9 barrios and Rincón Pueblo (the downtown area and the administrative center of the city). It is part of the Aguadilla-Isabela-San Sebastián Metropolitan Statistical Area.

The municipality is home to many of the surfing beaches in Puerto Rico, including Domes, Marias, Tres Palmas, Sandy Beach, Pools Beach, Córcega Beach and Rincón Town Beach. The word "Rincón" means "nook" in Castilian Spanish. Rincón is in the north, on the westernmost tip of Puerto Rico.

History 

Rincón was founded in 1771 by Don Luis de Añasco. In 1885, Benito Cumpiano was mayor of Ríncon and in 1890, Victor Cumpiano was Ríncon's mayor.

Puerto Rico was ceded by Spain in the aftermath of the Spanish–American War under the terms of the Treaty of Paris of 1898 and became a territory of the United States. In 1899, the United States Department of War conducted a census of Puerto Rico finding that the population of Rincón was 6,641.

On September 20, 2017 Hurricane Maria struck the island of Puerto Rico. In Rincón, infrastructure was damaged and about 400 homes were damaged or completely destroyed. Intense rainfall and winds triggered numerous landslides. The storm surge bought 4 feet of water into homes on the coast.

Geography
Rincón is located on the western coast of Puerto Rico, on the westernmost tip.

Updated flood zone maps (as of 2019) show that Rincón is extremely vulnerable to flooding, along with Humacao, Toa Baja, Barceloneta, and Corozal. For its high levels of erosion, Rincón is vulnerable in the case of a major hurricane.

Barrios
Like all municipalities of Puerto Rico, Rincón is subdivided into barrios.

 Atalaya
 Barrero
 Calvache
 Cruces
 Ensenada
 Jagüey
 Pueblo, (not to be confused with Rincón barrio-pueblo)
 Puntas
 Rincón barrio-pueblo
 Río Grande

Sectors

Barrios (which are like minor civil divisions) in turn are further subdivided into smaller local populated place areas/units called sectores (which means sectors in English). The types of sectores may vary, from normally sector to urbanización to reparto to barriada to residencial, among others.

Special Communities

 (Special Communities of Puerto Rico) are marginalized communities whose citizens are experiencing a certain amount of social exclusion. A map shows these communities occur in nearly every municipality of the commonwealth. Of the 742 places that were on the list in 2014, the following barrios, communities, sectors, or neighborhoods were in Rincón: La Playa Sector in Barrero, Cerro Los Pobres, El Pico in Atalaya, Hoyo Caliente, and Parcelas Stella.

Bodies of water
Gorges: Caño García, Quebrada Grande de Calvache, Quebrada Los Ramos, Quebrada Piletas, Punta Ensenada.
River: Río Grande

Economy

The 1968 World Surfing Championship was held at Domes Beach in Rincón. Since then, surfers from around the world have been visiting Rincón.

Rincón has a tourism economy which also boasts scuba diving, snorkeling, and sunsets. Rincón has also been an area for internet-based companies to set up shop.

In 2007, Rincón was the site for the ISA World Masters where local surfer Juan Ashton won first place in the Masters division.

Agriculture
Fruits and sugarcane are the primary sources of agriculture in Rincón. Cattle ranching also is popular.

Industry

The major industry of Rincón is tourism.

The Boiling Nuclear Superheater (BONUS) Reactor Facility, also known to the locals as "the Domes", is a decommissioned nuclear plant. The construction of BONUS started in 1960, and the reactor had its first controlled nuclear chain reaction on April 13, 1964, achieving full power operation in September 1965. Operation of the BONUS reactor was terminated in June 1968 because of technical difficulties and the ensuing need for high-cost modifications. General decontamination of the reactor was performed with the goal of meeting unrestricted use criteria in all accessible areas of the building. Residual radioactive materials remaining in the structure were isolated or shielded to protect site visitors and workers. During subsequent years, more radioactive contamination was identified in portions of the building, and additional clean-up and shielding activities were conducted in the 1990s and early 2000s. It was Puerto Rico's only nuclear reactor.

Demographics
Rincón reported the smallest decline in population of any Puerto Rican municipality between the 2010 and 2020 censuses (no municipality recorded an increase). The population fell by only 13, less than 0.1% of the overall population.

As of 2020, 5.1% of the population is of non-Hispanic origin, making Rincón the least Hispanic municipality on the Puerto Rican mainland. This represents an increase from 2010, when only 3.6% of the population was non-Hispanic.

Tourism
"Art Walk", a community initiative to build the social fabric of Rincón, takes places every Thursday. Locals and tourists mingle in the main town square  in downtown Rincón to enjoy food, drinks, music and local art.

Landmarks and places of interest
There are 53 beaches in Rincón.
Main attractions of Rincón include:
La Bandera (Pico Atalaya)
Domes Beach
Steps Beach
Balneario de Rincón
 Punta Higuero Lighthouse
Tres Palmas Marine Reserve

Culture

Surfing

Rincón is well known as a surfing destination. Rincón rose to international recognition through the 1968 World Surfing Championship, which was held at Domes and Maria's Beaches. The winter surf along Rincón's coast is some of the best in the region. Generally regarded as one of the best surf spots across the globe, Rincón draws surfers from around the world and is the center of the island's surf scene. Dubbed the "Caribbean's Hawaii," winter waves here can approach 25–30 feet (6.7m) in height, sometimes equaling the force of the surf on Oahu's north shore. Famed surfing beaches in town include Little Malibu, Tres Palmas, Maria's, Indicators, Domes, Pools, Sandy Beach and Antonio's. The best time to surf is from November through March, but summer storms can also kick up the surf during the late summer.

Festivals and events
Rincón celebrates its patron saint festival in September. The  is a religious and cultural celebration that generally features parades, games, artisans, amusement rides, regional food, and live entertainment.

Other festivals and events celebrated in Rincón include:
 Whale watching – January and February
 Humpback whale Festival – March
 Surfing season – all year long
 Ultimate Dirt Challenge – March
 Rincón International Film Festival – April
 Coconut Festival – May
 Rincon Triathlon – June

Government

Like all municipalities in Puerto Rico, Rincón is administered by a mayor. The current mayor is Carlos López Bonilla, from the Popular Democratic Party (PPD). López was elected at the 2000 general election.

The city belongs to the Puerto Rico Senatorial district IV, which is represented by two senators. In 2016, Luis Daniel Muñiz Cortés and Evelyn Vázquez were elected as district senators.

Transportation 
There are 8 bridges in Rincón.

Symbols
The  has an official flag and coat of arms.

Flag
Created and designed by Evaristo Cardona Moreno and art performed by Jose Luis Cardona Martinez (his eldest son). The colors of the Rincón flag are red, orange, yellow, green and white. The triangle has a five-pointed white star representing the urban zone. There are white stars of equal size which represent the 9 barrios. The red and orange symbolize the vitality and vigor of its people. The yellow symbolizes Christianity, the green symbolizes vegetation and hope for progress and the white symbolizes the integrity between its barrios and urban zone.

Coat of arms
Created and designed by Angel L. Cardona Moreno, the shield consists of a green and orange Spanish blazon, with a yellow band inclined left to right. To the right and on a green background a cross, symbol of Christendom. To the left and on an orange background a Spanish ship, symbol of the discovery of Puerto Rico, in the coasts of Rincón (this is greatly disputed, as the towns of Aguada, Rincón, and Añasco all claim entry-point status).

Notable people
Kiara Ortega – Miss Universe Puerto Rico 2018

Gallery
Some of the scenes in Rincón:

See also

List of Puerto Ricans
History of Puerto Rico
National Register of Historic Places listings in Rincón, Puerto Rico
Did you know-Puerto Rico?

References

Further reading

External links 
 Puerto Rico Government Directory – Rincón

 
Municipalities of Puerto Rico
Populated places established in 1771
Aguadilla–Isabela–San Sebastián metropolitan area